The Prince-Bishopric of Regensburg was a small ecclesiastical principality of the Holy Roman Empire located near the Free Imperial City of Regensburg in Bavaria.  It was elevated to the Archbishopric of Regensburg in 1803 after the dissolution of the Archbishopric of Mainz. The Prince-Bishopric of Regensburg must not be confused with the Roman Catholic Diocese of Regensburg, which was considerably larger.

History

The diocese was founded in 739 by Saint Boniface; it was originally subordinate to the archbishop of Salzburg. In the 13th century, the bishop of Regensburg became a prince of the Holy Roman Empire with a seat and vote at the Imperial Diet. As an enclave of the Duchy of Bavaria, the prince-bishopric was not able to expand territorially and remained one of the smallest of the Empire.

In the course of the German mediatization of 1803, the prince-bishopric was united with the Free Imperial city of Regensburg and other territories to form the Principality of Regensburg. Karl Theodor Anton Maria von Dalberg was the first prince-archbishop. In 1810, the pincipality became part of the Kingdom of Bavaria, although it retained archiepiscopal status. This followed the fall of the Holy Roman Empire in 1806 during the War of the Third Coalition. 

The Bavarian Concordat of 1817 following Dalberg's death downgraded the Archdiocese of Regensburg into a suffragan diocese subordinate to the archbishop of Munich and Freising.

Famous prince-bishops

 Saint Wolfgang (972–994)
 Saint Albertus Magnus (1260–1262)
 Joseph Clemens of Bavaria (1685–1716)
 Clemens August of Bavaria (1716–1719)

See also
Roman Catholic Diocese of Regensburg

Further reading
Josef Staber: Kirchengeschichte des Bistums Regensburg. Regensburg 1966 (in German)

External links
 Official website 

Prince-bishoprics of the Holy Roman Empire in Germany
Roman Catholic dioceses in the Holy Roman Empire
739 establishments
Dioceses established in the 8th century
13th-century establishments in the Holy Roman Empire
1803 disestablishments in the Holy Roman Empire
States and territories established in the 13th century
Bavarian Circle
Regensburg

it:Diocesi di Ratisbona
la:Dioecesis Ratisbonensis
no:Regensburg bispedømme